Railway stations in Sierra Leone include:

Maps 

The MSN and FallingRain and UNHCR maps still show the railway lines closed in 1974.
 UN Map of Sierra Leone - no railways shown at all.
 UNHCR Atlas map
 Map on page 24.
 African Mineral iron ore railway Map

Towns served

Open 
 (private  line) 
 (upgraded to 20Mtpa) (Mtpa = Million Tonnes Per Annum?)
 (renewed line to be open access) 
 Port Pepel - low capacity port
 Madina
 Lungi Lol
 Makoato
 Bankasoka River bridge
 Port Loko 
 Lunsar - terminus at mine

 Marampa - iron ore mine.
 Makeni
 Bumbuna
 Tonkolili - proposed extension to iron ore deposit

Under construction 

 (new parallel  gauge line)
 (capacity 50Mtpa)
 (new line to be open access) 
 Tagrin Point proposed high capacity port
 Marampa - iron ore mine.
 Makeni
 Bumbuna
 Tonkolili - proposed extension to iron ore deposit 
 Kasafoni - proposed iron ore mine

Proposed

2013 
 Tonkolili - iron ore mine
 Sulima southern port at the mouth of the Moa River.

Closed 

(government  line)

 Freetown in 1896. 
 Wellington (7 miles) by March 1897.
 Waterloo April 1898 
 Songo (32 miles/51.5 km) 1899 
 Bradford - way station
 Rotifunk (56 miles/90.1 km) 1900 
 Bauya - junction
 Moyamba
 Mano
 Bo (103 miles/165.8 km) 1903 
 Gerihun
 Blama
 Baiima (145m) (220 miles/354 km) 1905 
 Pendembu (227.5 miles/366 km) 1907 
 Kenema
 Daru - terminus

 Bauya - junction
 Magburaka - branch
 Makeni - branch terminus

Possible 

 Bagla Hills - iron ore

Timeline 

 September 2008 - dispute over mining leases hampers rehabilitation of Marampa railway.

Theft 

While the Port Pepel line is non-operational, much theft of the rail and sleepers is taking place.  The only advantage of this is to make conversion to standard gauge more easy.

See also 
 Sierra Leone Government Railway
 Transport in Sierra Leone
 Rail transport in Sierra Leone

References

External links 

 
Railway stations
Railway stations